The A12 is an Italian autostrada (motorway), composed of two unconnected parts. The first one connects Genoa and Rosignano Marittimo, the second connects Civitavecchia and Rome. The road is one of the motorways on the Italian west coast.

Overview
Plans to build the remaining stretch have existed for long time, but have never been executed, mostly because of the bad impact on the environment. A "superstrada" (an almost motorway-like road, with 2 separate carriageways and interchanges) with a speed limit of  exists between Rosignano Marittimo and Grosseto, but the present road between Grosseto and Civitavecchia has  speed limit, with long parts of single carriageway and even some parts of 2-lane road.

The 2 proposed solutions are an entirely new motorway (with higher impact on the environment), and the upgrade to motorway standard of the present road (more environmentally friendly). Lack of agreement between supporters of either idea has led to the present situation.

The road is also known as "Autostrada Azzurra", the Blue Motorway.

On 17 May 2017 the European Commission announced that it would be taking legal action against the government of Italy for awarding an extension of its A12 motorway concession contract to Società Autostrada Tirrenica p.A without undertaking a competitive procurement exercise in accordance with EU procurement regulations.

References

External links

A12
Transport in Liguria
Transport in Tuscany
Transport in Lazio